Marine Fighting Squadron 452 (VMF-452) was a fighter squadron of the United States Marine Corps that was commissioned and fought during World War II.   Known as the “Sky Raiders”, they flew the F4U Corsair, and the Grumman TBF Avenger, fell under the command of Marine Carrier Group 5 (MCVG-5) and fought in the Battle of Okinawa.  The squadron is best known for being aboard the  when she was severely damaged by Japanese kamikaze planes of the coast of Okinawa on March 19, 1945.  VMF-452 was deactivated on December 31, 1949 and has remained in an inactive status since.

History
VMF-452 was commissioned at Marine Corps Air Station Mojave, California.

On February 7, 1945, the squadron departed San Francisco on board the aircraft carrier .  From there they sailed to Pearl Harbor and then moved west to join up with Task Force 58 which was heading to support the invasion of Okinawa.  On March 18 they flew their first combat missions against airfields on Kyūshū Island.  The following day, the Franklin was attacked by a Japanese Yokosuka D4Y Judy dive bomber.  Both of its two 500-pound bombs stuck the Franklin.  33 members of VMF-452 were killed in the ensuing devastation and the squadron was no longer combat effective.  They transferred to the USS Bunker Hill and set sail for the United States.

Upon returning to the California, the squadron was sent to Marine Corps Air Station El Centro to refit and rearm in April 1945.  They remained there until the end of the war.

Notable former members
 Norwood Russell Hanson

Unit awards

A unit citation or commendation is an award bestowed upon an organization for the action cited. Members of the unit who participated in said actions are allowed to wear on their uniforms the awarded unit citation. VMF-452 was presented with the following awards:

See also 
 United States Marine Corps Aviation
 List of active United States Marine Corps aircraft squadrons
 List of decommissioned United States Marine Corps aircraft squadrons

Notes

References
Bibliography

 Web

 List of VMF-452 members killed onboard the USS Franklin on March 19, 1945

Fighting452
Inactive units of the United States Marine Corps